"Toute seule" is the name of a 2002 song recorded by the French artist Lorie. The song was released on 19 March 2002 as third and last single from her debut album, Près de Toi, on which it features as fourth track (and as 16th track on a remixed version). It was a top ten hit in France, and a top 15 hit in Belgium (Wallonia).

Song information
The music video, shot at Studio Canadian, was directed by Vincent Egret and produced by Plein Sud Films. In the lyrics, the singer says she prefers to remain alone instead of dating with a stupid boy.

The song is included on Lorie's best of, Best of. As it was performed on the singer's three tours, it also features on the live albums Live Tour (third track), Week End Tour and Live Tour 2006 (included in a medley, 12th track). It also appears on many compilations, such as  Hitbox 2002 - Best Of vol. 4.

Chart performances
"Toute seule" charted for 27 weeks. It started at number 17 on 23 March 2002, then reached a peak of number eight, and stayed there for three consecutive weeks. It totalled twenty weeks in the top 50. It finally achieved Gold status and was the 46th best-selling of the year.

In Belgium (Wallonia), the single debuted at number 29 on 30 March and peaked at number 12 for three non consecutive weeks. It remained for nine weeks in the top 20 and 16 weeks in the top 40. It was ranked 46th on the Annual Chart.

The single was briefly charted in Switzerland: it stayed for six weeks in the top 100, peaking at number 44 when it entered the chart, on 19 May.

Track listings
 CD single
 "Toute seule" (edit video) — 3:33
 "Toute seule" (tam tam remix) — 3:35

 CD limite édition
 "Toute seule" (edit video) — 3:29
 "By My Side" — 3:41
 "Toute seule" (tam tam remix) — 3:36
+ 6 Stickers.

 Digital download
 "Toute seule" (album version) — 3:31
 "Toute seule" (2003 live version) — 3:35
 "Toute seule" (2004 live version) — 3:54

Charts and sales

Peak positions

End of year charts

Certifications and sales

External links
 "Toute seule", lyrics + music video

References

2002 singles
Lorie (singer) songs
Songs written by Louis Element
2002 songs